Yuryaku Seamount (also called Yuryaku Guyot) is a seamount (underwater volcano) and guyot (flat-topped) located northwest of Hawaii. It is located a little southwest of the V-shaped bend separating the Emperor Seamounts from the older Hawaiian islands, all of the Hawaiian-Emperor seamount chain in the North Pacific Ocean.

Geology
Alkalic basalt dredged from Yuryaku Seamount is similar to the alkalic basalt that caps the volcanoes in the Hawaiian Islands. Analyses gave a mean age of 42.3 ± 1.6 m.y. for Yuryaku Seamount. The data collected helped show that the age of the Hawaiian-Emperor bend is about 41 to 43 m.y. Alkalic basalt have been sampled at Yuryaku Seamount.

The last eruptions of Yuryaku Seamount was 43 million years ago, during the Eocene epoch of the Paleogene Period.

See also
List of volcanoes in the Hawaiian – Emperor seamount chain

References

Hawaiian–Emperor seamount chain
Seamounts of the Pacific Ocean
Guyots
Hotspot volcanoes
Polygenetic volcanoes
Eocene volcanoes
Paleogene Oceania